Les Parisiennes was a group of French dancers and singers.

Funded in 1964 by Claude Bolling, the titles of the Parisiennes were for the most part composed by him, and written by Franck Gerald. The band originally dissolved in 1971, and had multiple short-lived formations.

Members
Raymonde Bronstein 
Anne Lefébure 
Hélène Longuet 
Anne-Marie Royer 
Viviane Chiffre 
Marie Lefleve 
Hélène Amador 
Yveline Arnaud 
Nathalie Bréhal 
Annie Lecreux 
Antonia Berkov 
Juliet Naylor 
Arielle Dombasle 
Mareva Galanter 
Inna Modja 
Helena Noguerra

Lineups 

Les Parisiennes / Claude Bolling Et Les Parisiennes
1964-1971
 Raymonde Bronstein
 Anne Lefébure
 Hélène Longuet
 Anne-Marie Royer

Les Parisiennes
1971
 Anne Lefébure
 Viviane Chiffre
 Hélène Longuet
 Anne-Marie Royer

Les Parisiennes / Les Nouvelles Parisiennes
1972-1973
 Anne Lefébure
 Viviane Chiffre
 Hélène Amador
 Marie Lefleve

Les Parisiennes / Les Nouvelles Parisiennes
1973
 Anne Lefébure
 Viviane Chiffre
 Yveline Arnaud
 Marie Lefleve

Les Parisiennes
1974
 Yveline Arnaud
 Nathalie Bréhal
 Annie Lecreux
 Antonia Berkov

Les Parisiennes
1974
 Yveline Arnaud
 Nathalie Bréhal
 Annie Lecreux
 Juliet Naylor

Les Parisiennes
2018-2019
Arielle Dombasle
Mareva Galanter
Inna Modja
Helena Noguerra

Member timeline

References 

French musical groups
French girl groups